Ángel Luis Andreo Gabán (born 3 December 1972 in Madrid) is a water polo player from Spain, who was a member of the national team that won the gold medal at the 1996 Summer Olympics in Atlanta, Georgia. He also competed for his native country in the Summer Games of 2000 and 2004.

See also
 Spain men's Olympic water polo team records and statistics
 List of Olympic champions in men's water polo
 List of Olympic medalists in water polo (men)
 List of players who have appeared in multiple men's Olympic water polo tournaments
 List of men's Olympic water polo tournament goalkeepers
 List of world champions in men's water polo
 List of World Aquatics Championships medalists in water polo

References
 Spanish Olympic Committee

External links
 

1972 births
Living people
Sportspeople from Madrid
Spanish male water polo players
Water polo goalkeepers
Water polo players at the 1996 Summer Olympics
Water polo players at the 2000 Summer Olympics
Water polo players at the 2004 Summer Olympics
Water polo players at the 2008 Summer Olympics
Medalists at the 1996 Summer Olympics
Olympic gold medalists for Spain in water polo
World Aquatics Championships medalists in water polo
Competitors at the 2005 Mediterranean Games
Mediterranean Games medalists in water polo
Mediterranean Games gold medalists for Spain
Water polo players from the Community of Madrid
20th-century Spanish people
21st-century Spanish people